Elbert "Lefty" Eatmon (August 3, 1914 - February 9, 1998) was an American professional baseball pitcher in the Negro leagues. He played with the Birmingham Black Barons in 1937 and 1938.

The Quad-City Times called Eatmon the "foremost southpaw" in the Negro American League in 1938.

References

External links
 and Seamheads

Birmingham Black Barons players
1914 births
1998 deaths
Baseball pitchers
Baseball players from Alabama
Sportspeople from Tuscaloosa, Alabama
20th-century African-American sportspeople